Sultan Alauddin Riayat Shah III was the Sultan of Johor who reigned from 1597 to 1615. He resided at the new capital of Johor at Batu Sawar, but later moved his administration to Pasir Raja around 1609. In 1612, at the instigation of his co-ruler and half-brother Abdullah, (better known from period historical documents as Raja Bongsu or Raja Seberang; who after 1613 ruled as Abdullah Ma'ayat Shah) and Bendahara Tun Sri Lanang oversaw the editorial and compilation process of the Sejarah Melayu (Malay Annals), the most important Malay literary work of all time.

In 1606 Alauddin allied with the Dutch to fight the Portuguese in an attempt to oust them from Melaka in a joint military campaign. To this end he ratified two treaties with the Dutch Admiral Cornelis Matelieff de Jonge in May and September 1606. Following a crippling blockade of the Johor River in 1608 and 1609, he signed a peace agreement with the Portuguese in October 1610. His fate and death remain uncertain. Some claim that he fled Batu Sawar at the time of the Acehnese attack in 1613 and died in exile on Lingga while others claim that he had been captured twice by the Acehnese between 1613 and 1615 and subsequently sentenced to death around 1615. He is buried in Kota Tinggi, Johor.

References

Further reading
 Rouffaer, G.P., "Was Malaka Emporium vóór 1400 A.D. genaamd Malajoer? En waar lag Woerawari, Ma–Hasin, Langka, Batoesawar?", Bijdragen van het Koninklijk Instutuut voor Taal-, Letter- en Volkenkunde, vol. 77 (1921), pp. 1–174 and 359–604.
 Borschberg, Peter, "The Seizure of the Santa Catarina Revisited: The Portuguese Empire in Asia, VOC Politics and the Origins of the Dutch-Johor Alliance (c. 1602–1616)", Journal of Southeast Asian Studies, 33.1 (2002): 31–62. (This article can be downloaded free of charge at www.cambridge.org)
 Borschberg, Peter, "The Johor-VOC Alliance and the Twelve Years Truce. Factionalism, Intrigue and Diplomacy, c.1603–1613", Institute for International Law and Justice (IILJ) Working Paper, History and Theory of International Law Series, New York:  NYU, 8 (2009): 1–69. (This paper can be downloaded for free via www.ssrn.org or www.iilj.org)
 Borschberg, Peter, "The Singapore and Melaka Straits: Violence, Security and Diplomacy in the Seventeenth Century", Singapore: NUS Press, 2010. .
 Borschberg, Peter, "Hugo Grotius, the Portuguese and Free Trade in the East Indies", Singapore: NUS Press, 2011. .
 Borschberg, Peter, ed., "The Memoirs and Memorials of Jacques de Coutre: Security, Trade and Society in the Seventeenth Century",  Singapore: NUS Press, 2014. .
 Borschberg, Peter, ed., "Jacques de Coutre's Singapore and Johor, 1595–c. 1625", Singapore: NUS Press, 2015. .
 Borschberg, Peter, ed., "Journal, Memorials and Letters of Admiral Cornelis Matelieff de Jonge. Security, Diplomacy and Commerce in 17th-Century Southeast Asia", Singapore: NUS Press, 2015.
 Borschberg, Peter, ed., "Admiral Matelieff's Singapore and Johor, 1606–1616", Singapore, 2015.
 Borschberg, Peter, "The Value of Admiral Matelieff's Writings for the History of Southeast Asia, c.1600–1620", Journal of Southeast Asian Studies, 48(3) (2017): pp. 414–435. DOI
 Kwa, Chong Guan and Borschberg, Peter, eds: Studying Singapore before 1800, Singapore: NUS Press, 2018.

Sultans of Johor